Polistena (or  Polysthénē) is a comune (municipality) in the Metropolitan City of Reggio Calabria in the Italian region Calabria, located about  southwest of Catanzaro and about  northeast of Reggio Calabria.

Polistena borders the following municipalities: Anoia, Cinquefrondi, Cittanova, Melicucco, San Giorgio Morgeto.

History

Of uncertain historical origins, Polistena  territory was inhabited since prehistoric times. From the remains found, it appears to be the territory of transit of the Locresi during their ancestral migration. A village with the modern name is mentioned for the first time in the 13th century AD.

In 1783 Polistena was devastated by a violent earthquake, that razed to the ground most of the city and killed more than 2,000 people.  The city was rebuilt quickly, basing on a design by Neapolitan architect Pompeo Schiantarelli, creating an urban center in the upper part of the city.

Main sights

The Monument to the Fallen (Monumento ai Caduti) is located in Piazza del Popolo, and was sculpted by Francesco Jerace. The Palazzo Avati is located in the same square. In its facade is a portal where there is an Apotropaica mask.

Twin towns — sister cities
Polistena is twinned with:

  Anzola dell'Emilia, Italy

People
Fra' Girolamo Marafioti
Francesco Jerace
Ferdinando Adornato
Mimmo Calopresti
Franco Anile
Franco Macri

References

External links
 Official website
 www.polistena.net

Cities and towns in Calabria